Gizdepka is a river of Poland. It flows into the Bay of Puck at Osłonino.

Rivers of Poland
Rivers of Pomeranian Voivodeship
1Gizdepka